Zephyrarchaea grayi, also known as the Grampians Assassin Spider, is a species of spider in the family Archaeidae. It is endemic to Grampians National Park in Australia.

Taxonomy 
The holotype of the species was collected in Delley’s Dell in the Grampians National Park. The specific epithet is a patronym in honor of Dr. Mark Gray, who first collected the holotype for this species.

Description 
Females of the species are 3.36 mm in length.

Distribution and habitat 
The species is only known to inhabit wet eucalypt forest in Grampians National Park.

Conservation 
The species is a short-range endemic taxon whose range is restricted to the Grampians National Park. It is threatened by fire and climate change. A search of the type locality in 2010 after a fire failed to find any specimens.

References 

Spiders described in 2012
Archaeidae